For the teacher of Ash-Shadhili see Abu Abdallah ibn Harzihim

Sidi Ali ibn Harzihim or  Abul Hasan Ali ibn Ismail ibn Mohammed ibn Abdallah ibn Harzihim/Hirzihim (also: Sidi Hrazem or Sidi Harazim) was born in Fes, Morocco and died in that same city in 559/1163. He was a berber Sufi teacher, leader of a Ghazalian zawiya in Fes and was the spiritual master of Abu Madyan. Ibn Hirzihim was largely responsible for the propagation of the works of Al-Ghazali in northwest Africa. He taught at the Qarawiyin University of Fes and openly criticized the policies of the Almoravid dynasty. Ibn Harzihim was also responsible for the burial of Sidi Abu Hakam ibn Barrajan, which, according to some sources, was forbidden by the Almoravid sultan. Sidi Ibn Harzihim received his khirqa (the Sufi robe) from Ibn al-Arabi before Ibn al-Arabi's death in 1148. He received his teachings from his uncle Abu Muhammad ibn Saalih ibn Harzihim (d. 505/1112), who took it from  Al-Ghazali. He was buried at the Bab Ftouh (south-eastern gate) cemetery of Fes, in a mausoleum which also contains the tomb of the Alaouite dynasty's founder, Moulay Rashid. The water source "Sidi Harazim" was called after him.

Notes

Bibliography
Abu Yaqub Yusuf ibn al-Zayyat al-Tadili (d. 1230/1), Kitab al-tashawuf ila rijal al-tasawwuf (Rabat, 1997)
The way of Abu Madyan,  Appendix I: text and translation of "al-Qasida al-Nuniyya", a work attributed to ‘Ali ibn Hirzihim, 1996,

External links
Dar sirr.com 

Moroccan Sufi writers
1163 deaths
People from Fez, Morocco
Moroccan Maliki scholars
Shadhili order
12th-century Moroccan writers
Year of birth unknown
12th-century Berber people
Berber writers